Aceguá is the Uruguayan part of a town in the Cerro Largo Department of eastern Uruguay.

Geography
It is located on Route 8, on the border with Brazil. The border between Uruguay and Brazil passes through the town and the two parts are separated by an international street.

History
Its status was raised from populated centre to "Pueblo" (village) on 23 December 1941 by decree Ley 10.101 and then to "Villa" (town) on 14 April 1986 by decree Ley 15.810.

Population
In 2011 Aceguá had a population of 1,511.
 
Source: Instituto Nacional de Estadística de Uruguay

References

External links
INE map of Aceguá

Populated places in the Cerro Largo Department
Brazil–Uruguay border crossings